Jeff Payne (born 25 September 1938) is a Bermudian middle-distance runner. He competed in the men's 1500 metres at the 1968 Summer Olympics.

References

1938 births
Living people
Athletes (track and field) at the 1963 Pan American Games
Pan American Games competitors for Bermuda
Athletes (track and field) at the 1968 Summer Olympics
Bermudian male middle-distance runners
Olympic athletes of Bermuda
Athletes from London